Barbara Buatois (born 24 August 1977) is a French racing cyclist and one of the fastest female recumbent racers and ultra cyclists.

Buatois was born in Oullins. She rides recumbent bikes over the complete world HPV Championships as well as long distance events such as Raid Provence Extreme and Bordeaux–Paris. She won Race Across America 2010 (One stage  race) on a Recumbent Bicycle.

Records 
In 2009 she beat the women's world speed record for a 200-meter flying start speed trial, reaching 121.44 km/h (75.46 mph) at Battle Mountain, USA, in 2009, riding a streamlined recumbent bicycle. The previous record holder for this same category was Lisa Vetterlein who reached 107.16 km/h (66.59 mph) in 2005.

Her other records are: 
 One hour : 84.02 km with a fully faired recumbent bicycle, a Varna Tempest 
 One hour : 66.042 km with fully faired recumbent tricycle, the Varna 24
 One hour : 46.376 km unfaired
 1000m standing start  : 1.13,7   unfaired
 200m flying start :  12,71  unfaired
 12h road  :  347 km unfaired 2600m + climbing

Achievements 
2004 
 European Recumbent Championships : 1st  Tandem

2005
 Cyclevision European Championships: 1st
 World Recumbent Championships: 3rd

2006
 Cyclevision European Championships: 1st
 World Recumbent Championships: 1st
 Bordeaux Paris 625 km Race : 2nd in 26 hours 15 minutes.

2007
 Cyclevision European Championships: 1st Unfaired
 SaintéLyon 69 km Trail : 3rd in woman teams of 3 runners
 FFC French Recumbent Championships : 6th overall ( only lady )
 World Recumbent Championships: 1st
 Paris–Brest–Paris 2007 :  First Back to back tandem finisher in PBP history. 87 hours

2008
 Paris Half Marathon : 31st place ( 3900 contestants ) 1 h 33
 FFC French Recumbent Championships : 3rd place overall ( only lady )
 Bordeaux Paris 625 km Race : 1st Place 21 hours 51 minutes.( 44th overall, 2500 contestants )
 FFC French Recumbent Track Champion 2008

2009
 Paris Half Marathon : 31st place again !  ( 4900 contestant ) 1 h 31
 Raid Provence Extrème : First recumbent bike finisher in RPE history !  29 hours 46 minutes for 610 km and 10 000m +climbing
 World Recumbent championships : 1st
 Hour World Record : 84.02 km
 100 km World Record 80.64 km avg.
 200m flying start, world record :121, 44 km/h

See also 
Cycling records

References

External links 
 Official Facebook page
 Official website
 Video of 200m flying start record. 121.437 km/h
 Video of Hour World Record
 Video of One hour record - unfaired

1977 births
Living people
People from Oullins
French female cyclists
Sportspeople from Lyon Metropolis
Cyclists from Auvergne-Rhône-Alpes